The 2012 United States presidential election in Maryland took place on November 6, 2012, as part of the 2012 United States presidential election in which all 50 states plus the District of Columbia participated. Maryland voters chose 10 electors to represent them in the Electoral College via a popular vote pitting incumbent Democratic President Barack Obama and his running mate, Vice President Joe Biden, against Republican challenger and former Massachusetts Governor Mitt Romney and his running mate, Congressman Paul Ryan.

Maryland is one of six states where Obama did better in 2012 than in 2008, with his percentage of the vote increasing from 61.92% to 61.97%. He managed to flip Somerset County but lost Kent County which he won in 2008.

As of 2020, this is the last time a Republican won Anne Arundel County and a Democrat won Somerset County.

Primaries

Democratic

Republican

The Republican primary took place on April 3, 2012, the same day as the District of Columbia Republican primary and the Wisconsin Republican primary. After the primary, 37 delegates were selected to attend the Republican National Convention.

Green

Libertarian

General Election

Results

Results by county

Counties that flipped from Democratic to Republican
 Kent (largest town: Chestertown)

Counties that flipped from Republican to Democratic
 Somerset (largest town: Princess Anne)

By congressional district
Obama won 7 of the state's 8 congressional districts.

See also
 United States presidential elections in Maryland
 2012 United States presidential election
 2012 United States elections
 Maryland Republican Party
 Maryland Green Party
 Maryland Libertarian Party

Notes

References 

Maryland
2012
Presidential